The United Malays National Organisation; abbreviated UMNO or less commonly PEKEMBAR, is a nationalist right-wing political party in Malaysia. As the oldest continuous national political party within Malaysia (since its inception in 1946), UMNO has once been called Malaysia's "Grand Old Party". 

UMNO is a founding and the principal dominant member of the Barisan Nasional (BN) coalition, which taken along with its predecessor Alliance, had been the main governing party of Malaysia from the independence of Malaya in 1957 until its defeat in the 2018 general election. From 1957 to 2018, every Prime Minister of Malaysia was also the President of UMNO. It has since returned to power twice as a result of the 2020-2022 Malaysian political crisis, firstly as a partner in a Perikatan Nasional-led government and subsequently as the leading party in a BN-led government with UMNO vice-president Ismail Sabri serving as Prime Minister. 

A race-focused party, UMNO's goals are to uphold the aspirations of Malay nationalism and the racial concept of Ketuanan Melayu (lit. Malay Supremacy), as well as the dignity of the Malay race, the religion of Islam, as well as the country itself. The party also aspires to protect Malay culture as the national culture and to uphold, defend and expand Islam across Malaysia.

In the 2018 UMNO leadership election, which was considered by many as crucial to the party's progression, former Deputy Prime Minister Ahmad Zahid Hamidi was elected UMNO president in a three-cornered contest, defeating former UMNO Youth Chief Khairy Jamaluddin, and UMNO veteran Tengku Razaleigh Hamzah.

History 
After the British returned to Malaya in the aftermath of World War II, the Malayan Union was formed. However, the Union was met with much opposition due to its constitutional framework, which allegedly threatened Malay sovereignty over Malaya. A series of Malay congresses were held, culminating in the formation of the nationalist party, UMNO on 10 May 1946 at the Third Malay Congress in Johor Bahru, with Datuk Onn Jaafar as its leader. UMNO strongly opposed the Malayan Union, but originally did not seek political power. UMNO had no choice but continue playing a supporting role to the British colonial administration. The British cooperated with UMNO leaders and helped to defeat the communist insurgency.

In 1949, after the Malayan Union had been replaced by the semi-autonomous Federation of Malaya, UMNO shifted its focus to politics and governance. According to at least one official school textbook published during UMNO's time in government, the party fought for other races once they were at the helm of the country.

In 1951, Onn Jaafar left UMNO after failing to open its membership to non-Malay Malayans to form the Independence of Malaya Party. Tunku Abdul Rahman replaced Dato' Onn as UMNO President. In the following year, the Kuala Lumpur branch of UMNO formed an ad hoc and temporary electoral pact with the Selangor branch of Malayan Chinese Association to avoid contesting the same seats in the Kuala Lumpur municipal council elections.  UMNO and MCA eventually carried nine out of the twelve seats, dealing a crushing blow to the IMP. After several other successes in local council elections, the coalition was formalised as an "Alliance" in 1954.

In 1954, state elections were held. In these elections, the Alliance won 226 of the 268 seats nationwide. In the same year, a Federal Legislative Council was formed, comprising 100 seats. 52 would be elected, and the rest would be appointed by the British High Commissioner. The Alliance demanded that 60 of the seats be elected, but despite the Tunku flying out to London to negotiate, the British held firm. Elections for the council were held in 1955, and the Alliance, which had now expanded to include the Malayan Indian Congress, issued a manifesto stating its goals of achieving independence by 1959, requiring a minimum of primary school education for all children, protecting the rights of the Malay rulers as constitutional monarchs, ending the Communist emergency, and reforming the civil service through the hiring of more Malayans as opposed to foreigners.

When the results were released, it emerged that the Alliance had won 51 of the 52 seats contested, with the other seat going to PAS (the Pan-Malayan Islamic Party, a group of Islamists that split from UMNO). The Tunku became the first Chief Minister of Malaya.

Throughout this period, the Malayan Emergency had been on-going. The Malayan National Liberation Army (MNLA), the armed wing of the Malayan Communist Party (MCP), committed sabotage campaigns against the British by disrupting transportation and communication networks, attacking police stations, burning down factories, with the goal of gaining independence for Malaya by making British rule in Malaya too expensive to maintain. The colonial government declared the MCP, along with several left-wing political groups, illegal in 1948. In 1955, the Alliance government together with the British High Commissioner declared an amnesty for the communist insurgents who surrendered. Representatives from the Alliance government also met with leaders of the MCP in an attempt to resolve the conflict peacefully, as their manifesto in the election stated. Chin Peng, the MCP Secretary-General, insisted that the MCP be allowed to contest elections and be declared a legal political party as a pre-condition to laying down arms. However, the Tunku rejected this, leading to an impasse.

In 1956, the Tunku led a group of negotiators, comprising Alliance politicians and representatives of the Malay rulers, to London. There, they brokered a deal with the British government for independence. The date of independence was set as 31 August 1957 on the condition that an independent commission is set up to draft a constitution for the country. The Alliance government was also required to avoid seizing British and other foreign assets in Malaya. A defence treaty would also be signed.

The Reid Commission, led by Lord William Reid, was formed to draft the constitution. Although enshrining concepts such as federalism and a constitutional monarchy, the proposed constitution also contained provisions protecting special rights for the Malays, such as quotas in admission to higher education and the civil service, and making Islam the official religion of the federation. It also made Malay the official language of the nation, although the right to vernacular education in Chinese and Tamil would be protected. Although the Tunku and the Malay rulers had asked the Reid Commission to ensure that "in an independent Malaya all nationals should be accorded equal rights, privileges and opportunities and there must not be discrimination on grounds of race and creed," the Malay privileges, which many in UMNO backed, were cited as necessary by the Reid Commission as a form of affirmative action that would eventually be phased out. These measures were included as Articles 3, 152 and 153 of the Constitution.

Independence was declared by the Tunku in Merdeka Stadium on 31 August 1957, marking a transition into a new era of Malayan and Malaysian politics.

Independence 

In Malaya's first general elections in 1959, the Alliance coalition led by UMNO won 51.8% of the votes and captured 74 out of 104 seats, enough for a two-thirds majority in parliament, which would not only allow them to form the government again but amend the constitution at will. However, for the Alliance, the election was marred by internal strife when MCA leader Lim Chong Eu demanded his party be allowed to contest 40 of the 104 seats available. When the Tunku rejected this, many of Lim's supporters resigned, and ran in the election as independents, which cost the Alliance some seats.

In 1961, the Tunku mooted the idea of forming a federation named "Malaysia", which would consist of the British colonies of Singapore, Sabah, Sarawak, and also the British Protectorate of Brunei. The reasoning behind this was that this would allow the federal government to control and combat communist activities, especially in Singapore. It was also feared that if Singapore achieved independence, it would become a base for Chinese chauvinists to threaten Malayan sovereignty. To balance out the ethnic composition of the new nation, the other states, whose Malay and indigenous populations would balance out the Singaporean Chinese majority, were also included.

After much negotiation, a constitution was hammered out with some minor changes. For instance, the Malay privileges were now made available to all "Bumiputra", a group comprising the Malays and other indigenous peoples of Malaysia. However, the new states were also granted some autonomy unavailable to the original nine states of Malaya. After negotiations in July 1963, it was agreed that Malaysia would come into being on 31 August 1963, consisting of Malaya, Singapore, Sabah and Sarawak. Brunei ultimately decided to opt out of the federation due in part to an armed revolt by the People's Party (Parti Rakyat Brunei) which objected to the formation of Malaysia, and the Sultan of Brunei Omar Ali Saifuddien III's demand that he be recognised as the most senior Malay ruler—a demand that was rejected.

The Philippines and Indonesia strenuously objected to this development, with Indonesia claiming Malaysia represented a form of neocolonialism and the Philippines claiming Sabah as its territory. The United Nations sent a commission to the region which approved the merger after having delayed the date of Malaysia's formation to investigate. Despite further protests from the Indonesian President, Sukarno, the formation of Malaysia was proclaimed on 16 September 1963. Indonesia then declared a "confrontation" with Malaysia, sending commandos to perform guerilla attacks in East Malaysia (Sabah and Sarawak). The confrontation was ended when Suharto replaced Sukarno as president. The Philippines, which had withdrawn diplomatic recognition from Malaysia, also recognised Malaysia around the same time.

To reflect the change of name to Malaysia, UMNO's coalition partners promptly altered their names to the Malaysian Chinese Association and the Malaysian Indian Congress. Several political parties in East Malaysia, especially Sarawak, also joined the Alliance to allow it to contest elections there.

In the 1963 Singapore state elections, the Alliance decided to challenge Lee Kuan Yew's governing People's Action Party through the Singapore Alliance Party. UMNO politicians actively campaigned in Singapore for the Singapore Alliance, contending that the Singapore Malays were being treated as second-class citizens under the Chinese-dominated PAP government. All of the UMNO-backed Malay candidates lost to PAP candidates. UMNO Secretary-General Syed Jaafar Albar travelled to Singapore to address the Malay populace. At one rally, he called the PAP Malay politicians un-Islamic and traitors to the Malay race, greatly straining PAP-UMNO relations. The PAP politicians, who saw this as a betrayal of an earlier agreement with the Alliance not to contest elections in Malaysia and Singapore respectively, decided on running on the mainland in the 1964 general election. Although the PAP contested nine Parliamentary seats and attracted large crowds at its rallies, it won only one seat. The strain in race relations caused by the communal lines along which the political factions had been drawn led to the 1964 Race Riots in Singapore.

Alliance leaders also were alarmed at Lee's behaviour, which they considered unseemly for the Chief Minister of a state. They thought he was acting as if he were the Prime Minister of a sovereign nation. Finance Minister Tan Siew Sin of the MCA labelled Lee as the "greatest, disruptive force in the entire history of Malaysia and Malaya." Lee now seemed determined to press forward politically and continue contesting elections nationwide, with the formation of the Malaysian Solidarity Council—a coalition of political parties which called for a "Malaysian Malaysia", duplicating the effort introduced earlier by Dato' Onn Ja'afar.

On 7 August 1965, Prime Minister Tunku Abdul Rahman, seeing no alternative to avoid further bloodshed, advised the Parliament of Malaysia that it should vote to expel Singapore from Malaysia. Despite last-ditch attempts by PAP leaders, including Lee Kuan Yew, to keep Singapore as a state in the union, the Parliament on 9 August 1965 voted 126–0 in favour of the expulsion of Singapore.

Tunku opened his speech in Parliament with the words, "In all the 10 years of my leadership of this House I have never had a duty so unpleasant as this to perform. The announcement which I am making concerns the separation of Singapore from the rest of the Federation." On that day, Lee Kuan Yew announced that Singapore was a sovereign independent nation and assumed the role of prime minister. After the separation and independence of Singapore in 1965, the Singapore branch of UMNO was renamed the Singapore Malay National Organisation (Pertubuhan Kebangsaan Melayu Singapura).

Post-separation 
After the separation of Singapore from the Federation, the Alliance leaders focused on continuing its policies. One involved the Malay language, which was the official language of Malaysia. UMNO sought to reduce the reliance on English in government affairs. In this, it was aided by PAS, the Pan-Malaysian Islamic Party, which backed special rights for the Bumiputra, and the strengthening of Islam's position in public affairs. However, the PAP's Malaysian branch, which had now become Democratic Action Party (DAP), took a very strong stance against this, and continued the expelled PAP's call for a "Malaysian Malaysia". In 1968, the newly formed Parti Gerakan Rakyat Malaysia or Gerakan, led by Lim Chong Eu, also adopted the DAP's stance.

Matters came to a head in the 1969 general election. When polling closed on the mainland peninsula (West Malaysia) on 10 May, it emerged the Alliance had won less than half of the popular vote, although it was assured of 66 out of 104 Parliamentary seats available. Much of the losses came from the MCA, thus straining relations between the two parties. However, the Alliance was dealt an even larger blow on the state level, losing control of Kelantan, Perak, and Penang.

A major riot broke out in the aftermath of the election on 13 May 1969.  The Yang di-Pertuan Agong (King) declared a national emergency after being advised by the national government to do so. Parliament was suspended, with a National Operations Council (NOC) led by Deputy Prime Minister Tun Abdul Razak of UMNO, taking over the government. Further polling in East Malaysia as a continuation of the general election was also postponed indefinitely. Although the Cabinet still met under the Tunku as Prime Minister, his role was largely symbolic, with Tun Razak taking over the role of chief executive.

UMNO backbencher Mahathir Mohamad, who had lost his Parliamentary seat in the election, wrote a letter to the Tunku criticising his leadership. Mahathir organised a campaign with University of Malaya lecturer Raja Muktaruddin Daim, circulating his letter among the student bodies of local universities. Mass demonstrations broke out calling for "Malay sovereignty" and the Tunku's ousting. After the riot, Home Affairs Minister Ismail Abdul Rahman and Tun Razak agreed to expel Mahathir and former Executive Secretary of UMNO Musa Hitam from the party for breaching party discipline.

The suspended elections in East Malaysia were held in 1970, and restored the Alliance government's two-thirds majority in parliament. On 31 August that year, the Tunku announced the national ideology of Rukunegara and his planned retirement as Prime Minister in favour of Tun Razak. He also stated Parliament would be restored the following year.

The New Economic Policy 
After Tun Razak succeeded the Tunku in 1970, he began asserting UMNO's leadership in the Alliance more strongly. When the Tunku led the coalition, he had always consulted Alliance leaders regarding policy—if an Alliance leader objected, the policy was not passed. Under Tun Razak, UMNO was the base of the Alliance and thus the government. The NOC which he led until Parliament reconvened consisted of 7 Malays, one Chinese and one Indian.

In Tun Razak's cabinet, the two most powerful men other than him were Ismail Abdul Rahman and Ghazali Shafie, who had declared the Westminster-style Parliamentary system inappropriate for Malaysia. Tun Razak also readmitted to the party "ultras" who had been expelled, like Mahathir and Musa Hitam. Mahathir gained notoriety after his expulsion from UMNO by authoring The Malay Dilemma, a book promptly banned from Malaysia, which posited that the Malays are the definitive people of Malaysia, and thus deserved special rights as the sovereign people of the nation. It also controversially argued that the Malays needed affirmative action to overcome deficiencies in their genetic stock.

Hussein Onn, son of UMNO founder Dato' Onn Ja'afar, soon became a rising star in UMNO. After Ismail died suddenly of a heart attack in 1973, Hussein Onn succeeded him as Deputy Prime Minister. In the cabinet reshuffle that promoted Hussein Onn, Mahathir was given the key post of Minister for Education.

The Tun Razak government announced the New Economic Policy in 1971. Its stated goal was to "eventually eradicate poverty... irrespective of race" through a "rapidly expanding economy" which emphasised to increase the Malays' share in the national economy to a reasonable portion between all the races. The NEP targeted a 30 per cent Malay share of the economy by 1990. The government contended that this would lead to a "just society" ("Masyarakat Adil"), the latter slogan being used to promote acceptance of the policy. Quotas in education and the civil service that the Constitution had explicitly provided for were expanded by the NEP, which also mandated government interference in the private sector. For instance, 30% of all shares in initial public offerings would be disbursed by the government to selective Bumiputras. The old civil service hiring quota of 4 Malays for every non-Malay's was effectively disregarded in practice; between 1969 and 1973, 98% of all new government employees were Malay. Five new universities were opened under the NEP, two of which were targeted to focus on the poor Malays and Muslim citizens.

Tun Razak also began shoring up the government by bringing in several former opposition parties into the fold of the Alliance. Gerakan, PPP, PAS, and several former opposition parties in East Malaysia joined the coalition, which was renamed as Barisan Nasional. Barisan was formally registered as an organisation in 1974, the same year in which a general election was held.

There had been much internal conflict in the National Front regarding the election; in 1973, Lim Keng Yaik and several supporters of his aggressive pro-Chinese stance left the MCA for Gerakan. This contributed to internal strife, as the MCA was no longer the sole representative of Chinese interests in the National Front.

Discontent among student organisations in Malaysian universities soon posed a new problem for the UMNO-led government. However, Mahathir in his capacity as Minister for Education issued a stern warning to university students and faculty not to become involved in politics. However, after stories that children of rubber tappers had died after consuming poisonous wild yam due to poverty, university students reacted by staging the 1974 Baling demonstrations. The demonstrations resulted in the arrest of over 1,000 students, including Anwar Ibrahim who wasdetained under the Internal Security Act. In 1975, parliament passed amendments to the Universities and University Colleges Act which banned students from expressing support of or holding positions in any political party or trade union without written consent from the university's Vice-Chancellor. The act also banned political demonstrations from being held on university campuses. In 1976, however, mass demonstrations were held at the MARA Institute of Technology, protesting the UUCA. Mahathir then threatened to revoke the scholarships of the students, most of whom relied on public support to pay their way through university.

BN was also challenged in Sarawak after the 1974 election, which saw the Sarawak National Party led by James Wong become tied with the DAP as the largest opposition party in Parliament, both of them holding nine seats each. SNAP had campaigned against BN on a platform of opposing Chief Minister Abdul Rahman Ya'kub's pro-Malay policies, charging them with alienating the rural indigenous natives of Sarawak, such as the Iban. SNAP had been expelled from the Alliance in 1965 for supporting increased autonomy for Sarawak. In the aftermath of the election, Abdul Rahman ordered the detention of James Wong under the Sedition Act. SNAP elected a new leader, Leo Moggie, who secured the release of Wong and the entry of SNAP into BN in 1976.

In Sabah, BN controlled the state government through the United Sabah National Organisation (USNO), which strongly backed UMNO's pro-Malay and pro-Islam policies. In 1973, Islam was made the official Sabah state religion (the official religion of Sabah was originally Christianity, as permitted by the agreement signed before the merger), and usage of indigenous languages such as those of the Kadazan people was discontinued in favour of the Malay language. The USNO Chief Minister, Mustapha Harun, was also known for favouring political patronage as a means of allocating valuable timber contracts, and living an extravagant lifestyle, being ferried to his A$1 million Queensland home by jets provided with Sabahan public funds.

UMNO Baru (New UMNO) 

On 24 April 1987, UMNO held its Annual General Assembly and triennial Party election. The then Prime Minister and party President, Mahathir Mohamad, faced his first party election in 12 years, having been elected unopposed since the 1975 UMNO election.

The politics of the Malays, particularly UMNO politics, had undergone a sea change in the first few years of the Mahathir stewardship, and the party presidency was challenged for the second time in 41 years. The first challenge was a dull affair in which Hussein Onn was opposed by a minor party official named Sulaiman Palestin. In fact, in the early 1950s, Tunku Abdul Rahman's presidency had also been challenged by C. M. Yusof, who later became the Speaker of the Dewan Rakyat, but Tunku was not properly considered an incumbent then, being only a care-taker president.

The 1987 contest was a vastly different matter. Mahathir was opposed by his very popular former Finance Minister, Tengku Razaleigh Hamzah. The press took to referring to Mahathir and his supporters as Team A, and Razaleigh's camp as Team B. Team B included then Deputy Prime Minister Tun Musa Hitam, who was also the incumbent Deputy President of UMNO seeking re-election, as well as Datuk Suhaimi Kamaruddin, the former head of UMNO Youth and president of the Belia 4B youth organisation.

Team B was critical of Mahathir's policies, arguing that the Malaysian New Economic Policy had failed to benefit the poor Malays. It also criticised Mahathir's leadership style, alleging he acted unilaterally without consulting other leaders in UMNO and the Barisan Nasional. Team B was also perceived as less Islamist than Mahathir's faction.

Mahathir claimed that the charges against him were groundless, and suggested that his opponents were fracturing Malay unity and were only motivated by greed.

Eventually, Mahathir was returned to office. However, he was elected with such a small majority of 43 (761 against 718 votes) that questions were immediately raised about his mandate. Team B supporters, many of whom had been anticipating a victory of similar margins, suspected that the election had been fixed. The Team B candidate for Deputy President, Musa Hitam, had also been defeated by Ghafar Baba of Team A, while two of the three vice-presidents were Team A candidates. The Supreme Council comprised 16 Team A candidates and 9 Team B candidates.

Allegations were made that several delegates who had voted were drawn from UMNO branches not properly registered. There were also several unproved allegations being bandied about that the balloting process had not been above board.

Nevertheless, Razaleigh pledged to support Mahathir, provided that a "witch hunt" was not launched. However, Mahathir promptly purged the government cabinet of all Team B members, and launched similar reshuffles in state and local governments.

On 25 June 1987, an appeal was filed by 12 of the UMNO delegates to have the assembly and the election of April 1987 declared null. After one of the delegates, Hussain bin Manap, withdrew unexpectedly in August from filing the appeal, the remaining litigants have since become famous as the "UMNO 11." Although Razaleigh and Musa Hitam were not among the plaintiffs, it was widely believed that Razaleigh was funding the appeal.

After a series of interlocutory hearings over the discovery of documents that took more than seven months, the matter finally came before Justice Harun Hashim in the Kuala Lumpur High Court on 4 February 1988. The judge ruled that under the existing law he had no option but to find the party, UMNO, to be an unlawful society due to the existence of several unregistered branches—an illegal act under the Societies Act of 1966. The question of the Assembly itself being illegal therefore became academic.

"'It is a very hard decision to declare UMNO unlawful,' said Justice Datuk Harun Hashim in his February 4 judgement. 'But the law was made by our Parliament and certainly UMNO was aware [of the Societies Act] because they were in the majority [in Parliament] at all times [when the law was made].' Under the 1966 Act, amended five times over the years, and most recently by Mahathir's government, each of the society's branches has to register separately with the Registrar...."

The Tunku and former UMNO President Hussein Onn set up a new party called UMNO Malaysia, which claimed to be the successor to the old UMNO. UMNO Malaysia was supported mainly by members of the Team B faction from UMNO, but Mahathir was also invited to join the party leadership. However, the party collapsed after the Registrar of Societies refused to register it as a society without providing an explanation.

Mahathir showed no interest in reviving UMNO, and instead he set in motion the machinery to form a new surrogate party, and in due course, registered a party formally called Pertubuhan Kebangsaan Melayu Bersatu (Baru) or UMNO (New) a week after UMNO Malaysia's registration was rejected. Eventually the suffix "(New)" was dropped, and UMNO (Baru) became both the de facto and de jure successor of original UMNO, dropping the 'Baru' suffix with the old UMNO's assets handed over. Most of its leaders, however, were selected from Team A of the old UMNO, with Team B ignored.

In 10th general election in 1999, rocked by the arrest and trial of former UMNO deputy Anwar Ibrahim and the subsequent formation of the Barisan Alternatif opposition coalition, UMNO's share dipped to 54% of the vote and 102 out of 144 seats.

Post-Mahathir 

After Mahathir stepped down as President of UMNO in 2003, he was replaced by his designated successor, Abdullah Ahmad Badawi, who became Prime Minister of Malaysia. Najib Razak, the son of Tun Abdul Razak, took over as the Deputy Prime Minister of Malaysia.

In the 11th general election in 2004, Barisan Nasional, under Abdullah's leadership, enjoyed a landslide victory. However, in the 12th general election in 2008, the coalition for the first time fell short of a two-thirds majority in the Parliament. UMNO Chief Ministers were ousted in the states of Selangor, Perak, Penang and Kedah. As a result, Abdullah resigned as President of UMNO and Prime Minister in 2009. He was succeeded by Najib.

Under Najib's leadership, UMNO gained a total of 9 seats in the 13th general election and retook the state of Kedah.

In 2018, UMNO was required to hold an leadership election 19 April by the requirements of the Registry of Societies (RoS), to hold a leadership election within five years of the last leadership election, as the last leadership election was in 2013. In April, some UMNO members filed a suit to declare UMNO illegal but was dismissed by the High Court. UMNO announced in May that the RoS had in 2017 allowed UMNO to postpone the election until 19 April 2019.

On 9 May 2018, Mahathir and the Pakatan Harapan coalition won the 14th General Election ending UMNO's 61 year long rule as part of the Alliance and later Barisan Nasional coalition. UMNO experienced a mass exodus of rank-and-file members, state chiefs, as well as Members of Parliament in favour of Mahathir's Bersatu and regionalist parties such as Parti Warisan Sabah in the months after the election.

After the general election defeat, UMNO held the UMNO leadership election in June 2018 instead of 2019. Ahmad Zahid Hamidi won the election and became the president of UMNO.

In September 2019, UMNO decided to form a pact with the Pan-Malaysian Islamic Party called Muafakat Nasional. Its main purpose is to unite the Malay Muslim communities for electoral purposes.  There is however no formal agreement with the other parties of Barisan Nasional, although there are calls for Barisan Nasional to migrate to Muafakat Nasional.  Barisan Nasional continued to function as a coalition of four parties comprising UMNO, MCA, MIC and PBRS, but aligned themselves with Perikatan Nasional to form a new government in March 2020 after the collapse of the Pakatan Harapan government.

In February 2020, in the leadup to the 2020–2022 Malaysian political crisis, UMNO leaders Ahmad Zahid Hamidi and Ismail Sabri Yaakob, along with Bersatu President Muhyiddin Yassin, PAS President Abdul Hadi Awang and PKR defector members led by Azmin Ali, collectively convened at the Sheraton Petaling Jaya hotel to initiate a change in government, thus causing political instability by depriving the elected Pakatan Harapan government of a majority within the 14th Malaysian Parliament. As a result, Prime Minister Mahathir Mohamad (along with the Seventh Mahathir cabinet) tendered their resignation. In March 2020, after the Yang di-Pertuan Agong consulted all members of the 14th Malaysian Parliament, Muhyiddin Yassin, with the support of UMNO and other parties, was deemed to have the greatest support within Parliament and was selected as the 8th Prime Minister of Malaysia.

In Muhyiddin cabinet, which formed on 10 March 2020, six UMNO MP's became Ministers & eight UMNO MP's became Deputy Ministers.

In July 2021, further political instability ensued when UMNO, at the direction of its President Ahmad Zahid Hamidi, withdrew support for the government led by Muhyiddin along with his cabinet. Zahid claimed that as Muhyiddin failed to spearhead economic recovery and effectively handle the Covid-19 pandemic, therefore Zahid claimed Muhyiddin failed to fulfil the conditions underlined by UMNO when it backed Muhyiddin to become prime minister in March 2020. In August 2021, after the Yang di-Pertuan Agong required all members of the 14th Malaysian Parliament to submit a statutory declaration (SD) indicating their preference of Prime Minister, Ismail Sabri Yaakob possessed the greatest support within Parliament (with 114 affirmative SDs out of a possible 222) and was selected as the 9th Prime Minister of Malaysia (without an electoral mandate).

In the 2022 election, UMNO, as a part of BN, faced the worst-ever result in Malaysian history, with only winning 26 out of 222 seats. Several key figures including Noh Omar, Tengku Razaleigh Hamzah, Mahdzir Khalid, Azeez Rahim, Tengku Zafrul Aziz, Khairy Jamaluddin, lost to either PN or PH candidates. UMNO was also defeated at several state elections held in Pahang, Perlis and Perak. Ahmad Zahid Hamidi, the party president, was re-elected with a slim majority.

Ideology 

UMNO overtly represents the Malays of Malaysia, although any Bumiputra (indigenous Malaysian, a category which includes people such as the non-Malay and usually non-Muslim Kadazan, Iban, Dayak, etc. of East Malaysia) may join the party. The party propagates Ketuanan Melayu, the concept that the Bumiputra, including ethnic Malays, enjoy a special status within the country by virtue of their earlier settlement of the lands that now form Malaysia and as a result of the recognition of Malays in Article 153 of the Constitution of Malaysia.

Bumiputera policies 
In 2018, Prime Minister Mahathir Mohamad announced the cabinet's decision for the government to "ratify all remaining core UN instruments related to the protection of human rights", including International Convention on the Elimination of All Forms of Racial Discrimination (ICERD) and other five previously unratified conventions at a United Nations General Assembly, UMNO, PAS along with various non-governmental organisations, staged an anti-ICERD rally that was held at the Dataran Merdeka, Kuala Lumpur, to protest against the ratifications of the relevant international conventions, due to their perception that these human rights instruments contravene with the special position of the Malays, bumiputera and Islam within the country; all of which are enshrined within the Malaysian Constitution.

On 23 November 2018, the Prime Minister's Office announced they would not ratify the convention and would continue defending the Federal Constitution, which they said represents a social contract that was agreed upon by all races during the formation of the country.

In 2021, a new equity policy for bumiputeras in the Twelfth Malaysia Plan (12MP) attracted controversy which were announced by Ismail Sabri Yaakob. It is said to ensure sustainable equity holdings by bumiputeras, an equity safety net would be launched to guarantee that the sale of shares or bumiputera-owned firms would only be sold solely to bumiputera-owned companies, consortium or individuals. Syed Saddiq said that the new rulings were unfair as they would be tantamount to taking equity from the non-bumiputeras and giving them to bumiputeras. Former Health Minister, Dzulkefly Ahmad had also described the policy as "suicidal" and claimed that the new policy would only kill the bumiputera companies economically if that is their intention. He also said that based on the feedback from Malay businessmen, most were against the idea of the new bumiputera-only policy being implemented. Ismail Sabri announced it after revealing that the government’s target to raise bumiputera equity ownership to 30% had yet to be achieved. He also announced funding to improve bumiputera businesses’ sustainability to hit 15% contribution in gross domestic product (GDP) by bumiputera micro, small and medium enterprises by 2025.

List of leaders

President

Wanita Chief

Pemuda Chief

Puteri Chief

Structure and membership

Current office bearer 
Official source

 Chairman of Advisory Council:
 Najib Razak
 Permanent Chairperson:
 Badruddin Amiruldin
 Deputy Permanent Chairperson:
 Abdul Fattah Abdullah
 President:
 Ahmad Zahid Hamidi
 Deputy President:
 Mohamad Hasan
 Vice Presidents:
 Wan Rosdy Wan Ismail
 Mohamed Khaled Nordin
 Johari Abdul Ghani
 Women's Chief:
 Noraini Ahmad
 Youth Chief:
 Muhamad Akmal Saleh
 Women's Youth Chief:
 Nurul Amal Mohd Fauzi
 Secretary-General:
 Ahmad Maslan
 Treasurer-General:
 Tengku Adnan Tengku Mansor
 Information Chief:
 Isham Jalil
 Executive Secretary:
 Mohd Sumali Reduan
 Election Director:
 Mohamad Hasan
 State Chairman:
 Perlis: Azlan Man
 Kedah: Jamil Khir Baharom
 Kelantan: Ahmad Jazlan Yaakub
 Terengganu: Ahmad Said
 Penang: Musa Sheikh Fadzir
 Perak: Saarani Mohamad
 Pahang: Wan Rosdy Wan Ismail 
 Selangor: Megat Zulkarnain Omardin
 Federal Territories: Johari Abdul Ghani
 Negeri Sembilan: Mohamad Hasan
 Malacca: Ab Rauf Yusoh
 Johor: Mohamed Khaled Nordin
 Sabah: Bung Moktar Radin

 Supreme Council Members (elected):
 Shamsul Anuar Nasarah
 Zambry Abdul Kadir
 Ahmad Maslan
 Tengku Zafrul Aziz
 Bung Mokhtar Radin
 Ahmad Jazlan Yaakub
 Abdul Azeez Abdul Rahim
 Shahaniza Shamsuddin
 Azian Osman
 Md Alwi Che Ahmad
 Shaik Hussein Mydin
 Zahida Zarik Khan
 Mohd Razlan Muhammad Rafii
 Mohd Sharkar Shamsudin
 Abdul Rahman Mohamad
 Mohd Puad Zarkashi
 Jamil Khir Baharom
 Johan Abd Aziz
 Isham Jalil
 Abdul Rahman Dahlan
 Lokman Noor Adam
 Ahmad Said
 Rosnah Shirlin
 Mohd Radi Alli Hassan
 Abdul Razak Abdul Rahman
 Supreme Council Members (appointed):
 To be appointed
 Supreme Council Members (in attending):
 To be appointed

Elected representatives

Dewan Negara (Senate)

Senators

Dewan Rakyat (House of Representatives)

Members of Parliament of the 15th Malaysian Parliament 

UMNO has 26 MPs in the House of Representatives.

Dewan Undangan Negeri (State Legislative Assembly) 

Malacca State Legislative Assembly
Pahang State Legislative Assembly
Perlis State Legislative Assembly
Perak State Legislative Assembly

Negeri Sembilan State Legislative Assembly
Terengganu State Legislative Assembly
Johor State Legislative Assembly
Kelantan State Legislative Assembly

Selangor State Legislative Assembly
Kedah State Legislative Assembly
Penang State Legislative Assembly
Sabah State Legislative Assembly

Sarawak State Legislative Assembly

UMNO state governments

General election results

State election results

Notes

References

Sources 
 Welsh, B (ed). The End of UMNO?: Essays on Malaysia's dominant party (SIRD, 2016)
 Chin, James. "Going East: UMNO's entry into Sabah Politics". Asian Journal of Political Science, Vol 7, No 1 (June) 1999, pp. 20–40.
 Goh, Jenny (23 July 1997). "Small spark can create big mess". Straits Times.
 Kamarudin, Raja Petra (7 November 2005). "The stuff politicians are made of". Malaysia Today.
 Pillai, M.G.G. (3 November 2005). "National Front parties were not formed to fight for Malaysian independence". Malaysia Today.
 Ibrahim Mahmood (1981) Sejarah Perjuangan UMNO, Penerbitan Antara Kuala Lumpur

External links 

 
 

 
Political parties established in 1946
Political parties in Malaysia
1946 establishments in British Malaya
Ethnic political parties
Defunct political parties in Singapore
Identity politics
National conservative parties
Social conservative parties
Conservative parties in Malaysia